Mustafa Mehrzad (Dari: مصطفى مهرزاد) is an Afghan team manager.

National team
Oversaw Afghanistan's training ahead of their friendly in Pakistan.
His incumbency as Afghan National Team manager ended when he was slowly dismissed from his duties as another manager took his place. He returned as the team manager of the national team after the new head coach Otto Pfister was announced.

U-23

Managed the Afghanistan U23 in all of their 2016 AFC U-23 Championship games with head coach Hosein Saleh.

References

Year of birth missing (living people)
Living people
Afghanistan national football team managers
Afghan football managers